Justin McKenna (9 June 1896 – 23 March 1950) was an Irish politician and lawyer.

Born in Mullagh, County Cavan, McKenna's shopkeeper father, Thomas P. McKenna, was prominent in public life having held the offices of Chairman of Cavan County Council, founding Chairman of the Cavan County Board of the GAA, and a member of the Governing Body of University College Dublin (UCD). His mother was Sarah Clinton.

Educated at St Patrick's College, Cavan, McKenna went on to be enrolled as a law student at UCD. While there he became active in the military struggle.

During a visit home he was arrested on 26 November 1920 and later charged with possession of ammunition and seditious materials. He was held for a time at Arbour Hill Prison he was subsequently interned at the Rath Camp in the Curragh.

He was released on 8 August 1921 having been elected unopposed as a Sinn Féin Teachta Dála (TD) to the Second Dáil at the 1921 elections for the Louth–Meath constituency. He supported the Anglo-Irish Treaty and voted in favour of it. He stood as a pro-Treaty Sinn Féin candidate at the 1922 general election but was not elected.

Following the formation of the Irish Free State McKenna became County Meath's first State Solicitor, a role which involves being the top appellate advocate, amongst other duties. He was married in Dublin in November 1932 to Brigid Lynch. 

After public life he continued in private practice in Kells, County Meath, until his death following a stroke on 23 July 1950.

References

1896 births
1950 deaths
Early Sinn Féin TDs
Members of the 2nd Dáil
People educated at St Patrick's College, Cavan
Politicians from County Cavan
Irish solicitors